ISIT or Isit may refer to:
Isit, Russia, a rural locality in Sakha Republic, Russia
Instituto Superior de Intérpretes y Traductores, a private university in Mexico City
ISIT, Institute of Intercultural Management and Communication, a French Grande Ecole
International Symposium on Information Theory, an IEEE symposium